Hsu Hsueh-li (born 8 April 1977) is a Taiwanese former professional tennis player.

From 1996 to 1999, Hsu played in a total of 14 Fed Cup ties for Chinese Taipei, securing three singles and five doubles wins (overall 8–9). Her appearances included three World Group II play-off ties in 1999, against Romania, Australia and Argentina.

Hsu was a member of Chinese Taipei's gold medal winning team at the 1998 Asian Games in Bangkok.

ITF Circuit finals

Doubles: 4 (2 titles, 2 runner-ups)

References

External links
 
 
 

1977 births
Living people
Taiwanese female tennis players
Tennis players at the 1998 Asian Games
Asian Games gold medalists for Chinese Taipei
Asian Games medalists in tennis
Medalists at the 1998 Asian Games
Universiade gold medalists for Chinese Taipei
Universiade medalists in tennis
Medalists at the 1997 Summer Universiade
20th-century Taiwanese women